Mikkel Aagaard (born 18 October 1995) is a Danish professional ice hockey forward who is currently playing with Modo Hockey of the HockeyAllsvenskan (Allsv).

Playing career
Undrafted, Aagaard played in his native Denmark with Frederikshavn White Hawks before moving to North America to play major junior hockey in the Ontario Hockey League with the Niagara IceDogs and the Sudbury Wolves.

On October 5, 2016, he embarked on his North American pro career in signing with the Stockton Heat of the AHL for the 2016–17 season. Aagaard split the season between the Heat and its ECHL affiliate, the Adirondack Thunder. He compiled 11 points in 25 games with the Heat before appearing in 4 post-season games with the club.

As a free agent from the Heat, Aagaard opted to continue in the AHL after securing a try-out to attend the Springfield Thunderbirds training camp. In making a positive impression, Aagaard was signed to a standard one-year deal with the Thunderbirds for the 2017–18 season on October 4, 2017. Aagard appeared in 23 games with Springfield before he was reassigned to ECHL affiliate, the Manchester Monarchs, then later released from his contract on February 1, 2018.

Unsigned through the off-season, Aagaard decided to take a hiatus from his professional career, enrolling to the University of Guelph to major in Accounting, while participating for the Gryphons in the Canadian Interuniversity Sport (CIS) on September 19, 2018.

Aagaard played parts of two seasons with Guelph before returning to the professional circuit to end the 2019–20 season, agreeing to a contract with German club, Grizzlys Wolfsburg of the Deutsche Eishockey Liga (DEL).

With the COVID-19 pandemic ending the DEL season before the playoffs, Aagaard moved to Sweden as a free agent, signing a two-year contract with Modo Hockey of the Allsvenskan on April 6, 2020.

Career statistics

Regular season and playoffs

International

References

External links
 
 Mikkel Aagaard at Beijing 2022
 

1995 births
Living people
Adirondack Thunder players
Danish ice hockey centres
Grizzlys Wolfsburg players
Frederikshavn White Hawks players
Manchester Monarchs (ECHL) players
Modo Hockey players
Niagara IceDogs players
Springfield Thunderbirds players
Stockton Heat players
Sudbury Wolves players
People from Frederikshavn
Sportspeople from the North Jutland Region